No. 19 - aka (Bagnall No' 2962) is a preserved 0-4-0 saddle tank locomotive, built by W.G. Bagnall in 1950. It was the final steam locomotive to work in the HM Devonport Dockyard, and is currently owned by the Cornish Steam Locomotive Preservation Society. 

In 1996, No. 19 was taken out of service so it would have its wheel tyres replaced, before returning to service in 1998.

Preservation

No. 19 is preserved by the Bodmin and Wenford Railway, in Cornwall, South-West England. The preserved locomotive is on hire to the Pontypool and Blaenavon Railway in South-East Wales for future seasons.

See also

 Bagnall fireless locomotives (preserved)

External links
 Bodmin and Wenford Railway page on No. 19

0-4-0ST locomotives
Bodmin and Wenford Railway locomotives
Preserved steam locomotives of Great Britain
Bagnall locomotives
Industrial locomotives of Great Britain